Oskar Zawisza (23 November 1878 in Jablunkov18 January 1933 in Těrlicko) was a Polish Catholic priest, composer and educational activist.

He was son of a teacher from Jablunkov. Zawisza finished German gymnasium in Bielsko and Theological faculty in Olomouc. He was a pupil of Czech composer Josef Nešvera. Zawisza was ordained as a priest on 23 July 1902. Then he became curate in Petrovice u Karviné, Dolní Bludovice, Niemiecka Lutynia, Strumień and Cieszyn. On 1 July 1911 he became a rector in Těrlicko.

He collaborated with Gwiazdka Cieszyńska and Zaranie Śląskie magazines. Zawisza conducted historical and ethnographic research and wrote also several books: Dzieje Strumienia (History of Strumień), Dzieje Karwiny (History of Karwina) and Śpiewnik góralski (Highlander's songbook); and operas Dożynki, Święta Barbara and Czarne diamenty, symphonic poem Znad brzegów Olzy and symphony Z niwy śląskiej.

References
 
 Kocych-Imielska, Maria (1989). Zapomniany historyk i ludoznawca. In: Kalendarz Cieszyński 1990. Cieszyn, pp. 128–130.

External links 
  Dzieje Strumienia online at Książnica Cieszyńska library
  Ogólna historya Cierlicka online at Książnica Cieszyńska library

1878 births
1933 deaths
People from Jablunkov
Polish people from Zaolzie
Polish Roman Catholic priests
Polish Roman Catholics
Polish publicists